"Hits Me Like a Rock" is a song by Brazilian band CSS featuring Bobby Gillespie of Scottish band Primal Scream. It was released as the lead single from their third studio album La Liberación.

The song is featured as soundtrack in EA Sports game, FIFA 12.

Track listing
Digital EP released on iTunes Japan only (July 6, 2011)
 Hits Me Like a Rock
 Tutti Frutti Fake
 Hits Me Like a Rock (Depressed Buttons Mix)
 Hits Me Like a Rock (Designer Drugs Remix)
 Hits Me Like a Rock (Kido Yoji Remix)

References

https://itunes.apple.com/jp/album/id446708598 
http://pitchfork.com/news/42931-new-css-hits-me-like-a-rock/

CSS (band) songs
Songs written by Adriano Cintra
2010 songs
Songs written by Lovefoxxx